Little Comrade is a lost 1919 American silent comedy film directed by Chester Withey and written by Alice Eyton and Juliet Wilbor Tompkins. The film stars Vivian Martin, Niles Welch, Gertrude Claire, Richard Henry Cummings, Larry Steers, and Elinor Hancock. The film was released on March 30, 1919, by Paramount Pictures.

Plot
As described in a film magazine, Genevieve Rutherford Hale (Martin), pampered daughter of wealthy parents, decides to become a farmerette to help win the war. She arrives at the Hubbard farm in her limousine and goes to work with a group of other young women. Bob Hubbard (Welch), the youngest son of farmer Hubbard (Cummings), falls in love with Genevieve, and when he enters an army training camp life becomes so distasteful that he goes AWOL and returns home. Genevieve persuades him to return to camp, but they are discovered together and the elder Hubbard sends the young woman away. Bob obtains a leave of absence and goes home to explain things to explain things to his father, and Genevieve's name is cleared in the eyes of the farmer and farmerettes. Bob becomes a good soldier and determines to marry Genevieve when the war is over.

Cast
Vivian Martin as Genevieve Rutherford Hale
Niles Welch as Bobbie Hubbard
Gertrude Claire as Mrs. Hubbard
Richard Henry Cummings as Mr. Hubbard
Larry Steers as Lieutenant Richard Hubbard 
Elinor Hancock as Mrs. Hale 
Nancy Chase as Isabel Hale
Pearl Lovici as Bertha Bicknell

References

External links 
 
 

1919 films
1910s English-language films
Silent American comedy films
1919 comedy films
Paramount Pictures films
Lost American films
Films directed by Chester Withey
American black-and-white films
American silent feature films
1919 lost films
Lost comedy films
1910s American films